The Empire Award for Best Sci-Fi/Fantasy is an Empire Award presented annually by the British film magazine Empire to honor the best sci-fi, fantasy or superhero film of the previous year. The Empire Award for Best Sci-Fi/Fantasy is one of four new Best Film ongoing awards which were first introduced at the 11th Empire Awards ceremony in 2006 (along with Best Comedy, Best Horror and Best Thriller) with Star Wars: Episode III – Revenge of the Sith receiving the award. A Monster Calls is the most recent winner in this category. Winners are voted by the readers of Empire magazine.

Winners and nominees
In the list below, winners are listed first in boldface, followed by the other nominees. The number of the ceremony (1st, 2nd, etc.) appears in parentheses after the awards year, linked to the article (if any) on that ceremony.

2000s

2010s

Notes

References

External links

Sci-Fi Fantasy
Awards for best film
Mass media science fiction awards